Lički Osik   is a village in Croatia situated 8 km north-east from Gospić. It is connected by the D25 highway.

Demographics
According to the 2011 census, the village of Lički Osik has 1914 inhabitants. This represents 66.34% of its pre-war population according to the 1991 census.

The 1991 census recorded that 54.42% of the village population were ethnic Serbs (1570/2885), 40.07% were Croats (1156/2885), 3.09% were Yugoslavs (89/2885) while 2.42% were of other ethnic origin (70/2885).

NOTE: The 1981 and 1991 figures include Budak population.

Gallery

References

Populated places in Lika-Senj County